Lukáš Havel (born November 10, 1981) is a Czech professional ice hockey player. He played with HC Oceláři Třinec in the Czech Extraliga during the 2010–11 Czech Extraliga season.

References

External links 
 
 

1981 births
Sportspeople from Jihlava
Czech ice hockey forwards
HC Oceláři Třinec players
Living people
HC Slavia Praha players
HC Litvínov players
MHC Martin players
Czech expatriate ice hockey players in Canada
Czech expatriate ice hockey players in Slovakia